The Man Upstairs is a 1992 American crime comedy-drama television film directed by George Schaefer and starring Katharine Hepburn and Ryan O'Neal. The film premiered on CBS on December 6, 1992.

Hepburn was nominated for a Golden Globe Award for Best Actress – Miniseries or Television Film at the 50th Golden Globe Awards.

Plot
An elderly woman named Victoria Brown discovers an escaped convict, Mooney Polaski, hiding in her attic. At first she is horrified, but gradually she becomes fascinated by the fast-talking fugitive and permits him to stay in her house while the local sheriff and his men hunt for him. A relationship develops between the unlikely pair: he finds the home he never had and she overcomes her loneliness.

Cast
 Katharine Hepburn - Victoria Brown
 Ryan O'Neal - Mooney Polaski
 Henry Beckman - Sheriff
 Helena Carroll - Molly
 Brenda Forbes - Cloris
 Florence Paterson - Mrs. Porter
 Sam Malkin - Store Owner
 Tom McBeath - Priest
 Lawrence King - Roy
 Robert Wisden - Mayor
 Kelli Fox - Suzy
 James Bell - Bull
 Kevin Conway - Andy
 Brent Stait - Mort
 Kevin McNulty - Interrogator
 Roark Critchlow - Boy Scout Leader
 Teryl Rothery - Female Newscaster
 Linden Soles - Male Newscaster

References

External links
 
 

1992 television films
1992 films
1992 comedy-drama films
1990s crime comedy-drama films
American crime comedy-drama films
CBS network films
Comedy-drama television films
Crime television films
Films directed by George Schaefer
Films scored by Billy Goldenberg
Films shot in Vancouver
1990s American films